Peshko is an East Slavic language surname. Notable people with the surname include:

Bohdan Peshko (born 1972), Ukrainian-Canadian bishop

See also
Peszko, Polish variant of the surname

East Slavic-language surnames